Wallagonia maculatus is a species of catfish in the family Siluridae (the sheatfishes) endemic to Malaysia, where it is known only from Sabah in northern Borneo. This species grows up to a length of  SL.

Until osteological research validated the genus Wallagonia in 2014, W. maculatus was included in the genus Wallago.

References

Siluridae
Fish of Asia
Fish of Malaysia
Endemic fauna of Malaysia
Fish described in 1959
Taxa named by Robert F. Inger